R. Mugo Gatheru (21 August 1925 – 27 November 2011) was a Kenyan writer. His autobiography A Child of Two Worlds describes growing up in colonial Kenya. 

Gatheru was born to a squatter family living on a European farm. He attended medical school in Nairobi, but was forced to continue his education abroad after he protested the treatment of Africans by the colonial rulers. After a year in India, he spent eight years from 1950 in the United States before studying law in England. He returned to Kenya when it gained independence in 1963.

He taught African and Middle Eastern history for many years at California State University in Sacramento.

Works
 A Child of Two Worlds: a Kikuyu's story, 1964
 Kenya : from colonization to independence, 1888-1970, 2005
 From beneath the tree of life : a story of the Kenyan people of Ngai, 2005

References

1925 births
2011 deaths
Kenyan writers
Autobiographers